"Dimension Jump" is the fifth episode of science fiction sit-com Red Dwarf Series IV and the twenty-third episode in the series run. It was first broadcast on the British television channel BBC2 on 14 March 1991, written by Rob Grant and Doug Naylor, and directed by Ed Bye. The episode, featuring the first appearance of Ace Rimmer, was intended to end the series; but Meltdown was rescheduled and broadcast last due to the Gulf War.

Plot
In a parallel dimension, Arnold Rimmer works as a test pilot in the Space Corps under the name 'Ace' Rimmer, who is popular, brave and a charming, good-looking person, with the others from Red Dwarf living alternate lives as well – Dave Lister is a Head Technician in the Corps; Cat is human and a priest; Kryten is human and Rimmer's superior; and Holly is human and Kryten's secretary. Returning from a mission, Ace is given the task of test-flying a dimension-jumping prototype spacecraft, accepting despite the risk he may never return. After saying farewell, he departs and initiates a dimension jump. Meanwhile, Lister, Kryten, Cat and Holly attempt to head out fishing on a nearby ocean planet without Rimmer, but are forced to take him along when he discovers this. As they are heading out in a Starbug, their ship collides with Ace's and crashes on the ocean planet. Ace follows after them to rescue them, and promptly makes friends with Lister, while in contrast Rimmer develops a mutual dislike of him.

Upon Starbug being repaired, the group return to Red Dwarf to provide treatment to Ace, after breaking his arm during the accident, who subsequently treats Cat for an injury he received. During this time, Lister and Rimmer talk about Ace. While Lister is in awe of him, Rimmer reveals disgust that he embodies all of the "breaks" he never received while growing up, and fails to be convinced to be happy that another version of himself was successful. Ace later meets with Lister and reveals that he plans to leave, unable to bear the kind of person he is in this dimension. When asked, Lister learns of the point of divergence in Rimmer's life which resulted in him becoming Ace; when he was young, Rimmer was under consideration to be held back a year in school – while Rimmer was able to progress further, Ace was kept back but was humiliated by this, prompting him to change and work harder, effectively creating the "break" in his life. Ace soon bids Lister farewell and proceeds on an impossible search to find a worse off Rimmer in another universe.

Production
The idea behind this episode came as a result of Chris Barrie (simultaneously filming this series while playing Gordon Brittas, another character disliked by those around him in The Brittas Empire) asking Rob Grant and Doug Naylor for the chance to play someone heroic, suffering from what he described as 'git overload'.

The ending scene went through numerous changes. The plan was to have Rimmer drop a load of kippers on Ace, but it didn't work on comic or practical levels. Since this didn't work well, the text scroll was added in the post production.

Several models for the episode were produced, including Ace's ship, the Io city dome and the Space Corps test space station. Filming of Ace's ship crashing into Starbug involved flying it through space on wires. The Starbug crash site was achieved using an ocean moon miniature construction.

For the first time in the series run, the end theme tune was changed. The director, Ed Bye, requested a "naff organ sound" to end the episode. In keeping with the Rimmer theme, Howard Goodall performed an instrumental arrangement over the end credits.

The regular cast all get to play their alternative universe roles. Chris Barrie plays Ace Rimmer, Craig Charles is Spanners, Danny John-Jules is the Chaplain, Robert Llewellyn is Bongo, and Hattie Hayridge got the chance to play more than just a computer head as Mellie. Kalli Greenwood appeared as Mrs. Rimmer and Simon Gaffney appeared as Young Rimmer—reprising their roles from Polymorph (and Simon also appeared as young Rimmer in "Timeslides"), while Hetty Baynes voiced the Cockpit Computer.

Cultural references
The spaceship scene introducing Ace Rimmer parodies the 1986 Tom Cruise movie Top Gun and even features similar heroic music. Jaws is mentioned by Lister as to where they're going in the middle of the night with fishing rods. After hearing Lister's nickname given by Ace, Rimmer references Skippy, "'Ace and Skipper?' You sound like a kids' TV series about a boy and his bush kangaroo!"

The episode plays heavily on the theory, for every decision, the alternative is played in another reality, opening the possibilities to infinite universes where anything could be true. Lister sums this up by saying, somewhere, there may be a super freaky weird reality where Rimmer is the better looking of the two. All the alternative characters appear as 'better' than those in the current reality; Rimmer is heroic and sexually irresistible, Lister is a brilliant engineer married to Kristine Kochanski, The Cat is a morally respectable chaplain, Kryten is a high-ranking space corps official, able to give orders rather than receive them.

Reception
The episode was broadcast on the British television channel BBC2 on 14 March 1991 in the 9:00pm evening time slot. Although it was intended to be shown as the series finale, the Gulf War hostilities at the time meant the BBC showed the episode fifth and swapped the finale with "Meltdown".

Considered to be one of the best episodes by many, it also topped the Series IV list in a Red Dwarf magazine poll—with 7.3% of the vote. In the Series IV DVD, Chris Barrie names this as his favourite episode.

The BBC decided to use the popularity of the episode to head the second part of the Series IV video tape release, despite "White Hole" fourth in the running order.

See also
 Backwards – the fourth Red Dwarf novel features the plot of "Dimension Jump" as well as other episodes.

Notes

References

External links

 
 
Series IV episode guide at www.reddwarf.co.uk 

Red Dwarf IV episodes
1991 British television episodes
Television episodes about time travel
Television episodes about parallel universes